Jaak Mae (born February 25, 1972) is an Estonian cross-country skier who has competed since 1994. He won a bronze in the 15 km event at the 2002 Winter Olympics in Salt Lake City.

Mae won a silver medal in the 15 km event at the 2003 FIS Nordic World Ski Championships in Val di Fiemme. He also finished fifth at the 2006 Winter Olympics and fifth at the FIS Nordic World Ski Championships 2009.

Cross-country skiing results
All results are sourced from the International Ski Federation (FIS).

Olympic Games
 1 medal – (1 bronze)

World Championships
1 medal – (1 silver)

World Cup

Season standings

Individual podiums
7 podiums – (7 )

References

External links
 
 

1972 births
Cross-country skiers at the 1994 Winter Olympics
Cross-country skiers at the 1998 Winter Olympics
Cross-country skiers at the 2002 Winter Olympics
Cross-country skiers at the 2006 Winter Olympics
Cross-country skiers at the 2010 Winter Olympics
Estonian male cross-country skiers
Living people
Olympic cross-country skiers of Estonia
Olympic bronze medalists for Estonia
Olympic medalists in cross-country skiing
FIS Nordic World Ski Championships medalists in cross-country skiing
People from Tapa, Estonia
Medalists at the 2002 Winter Olympics
20th-century Estonian people
21st-century Estonian people